Bakhtawar Cadet College for Girls is the first girls' cadet college in Pakistan. Founded in 2010, it is jointly run by the Government of Sindh and the Pakistan Air Force.

Background
This Cadet College was established in 2010 and is named after Mai Bakhtawar Lashari Shaheed, a woman murdered during a landlord/tenant confrontation in Sindh, British India, in 1946. Hired agricultural land workers by landlords are called 'haris' in Pakistan. She was killed for demanding her share in wheat production on 22 June 1946. To pay tribute to this noted hari movement leader,  
Human Rights Commission of Pakistan (HRCP) organized and held an event to mark her 70th death anniversary in 2016. 

Speakers at the event said, "Her struggle gave vigour to peasantry and led haris to recognise their rights. She was a symbol of bravery after the partition and the first martyr among women in Sindh". They also added that the agriculture sector of Pakistan was largely dependent on women, but womenfolk did not have adequate land ownership rights.

Bakhtawar Cadet College for Girls is situated on 100 acres of land and it started classes in 2017.

Location 
Bakhtawar Cadet College for Girls is situated approximately 260km up north from Karachi, about 4km from the outskirts of Shaheed Benazirabad (previously known as Nawabshah District), Sindh, Pakistan.

References 

Cadet colleges in Pakistan
Universities and colleges in Sindh